Üçevler can refer to:

 Üçevler, Bitlis
 Üçevler, İnebolu